Marilyn Nelson (born April 26, 1946) is an American poet, translator, and children's book author. She is a professor emeritus at the University of Connecticut,  and the former poet laureate of Connecticut, She is a winner of the Ruth Lilly Poetry Prize, the NSK Neustadt Prize for Children’s Literature, and the Frost Medal. From 1978 to 1994 she published under the name Marilyn Nelson Waniek. She is the author or translator of over twenty books and five chapbooks of poetry for adults and children. While most of her work deals with historical subjects, in 2014 she published a memoir, named one of NPR's Best Books of 2014, entitled How I Discovered Poetry.

Early life
Nelson was born on April 26, 1946 in Cleveland, Ohio, to Melvin M. Nelson, a U.S. serviceman in the Air Force, and Johnnie Mitchell Nelson, a teacher. She grew up on military bases, and began writing while in elementary school. She earned a B.A. from the University of California-Davis, an M.A. from the University of Pennsylvania in 1970, and a Ph.D. from the University of Minnesota in 1979.

Career
She is a professor emeritus of English at the University of Connecticut and the founder and director of Soul Mountain Retreat. She was poet laureate of the State of Connecticut from 2001 to 2006.

Her poetry collections include The Homeplace (Louisiana State University Press), which won the 1992 Anisfield-Wolf Award and was a finalist for the 1991 National Book Award; and The Fields Of Praise: New And Selected Poems (Louisiana State University Press), which won the Poets' Prize in 1999 and was a finalist for the 1997 National Book Award. Her honors include two NEA creative writing fellowships, the 1990 Connecticut Arts Award, a Fulbright Teaching Fellowship, and a 2001 Guggenheim Fellowship. In 2011, she spent a semester as a Brown Foundation Fellow at the University of the South in Sewanee, Tennessee. In 2012, the Poetry Society of America awarded her the Frost Medal. In 2013, Nelson was elected a chancellor of the Academy of American Poets.

Published works

Poetry books
 For the Body (Louisiana State University Press, 1978)
 Mama's Promises (Louisiana State University Press, 1985)
 The Homeplace (Louisiana State University Press, 1990)
 Magnificat (Louisiana State University Press, 1994)
 The Fields of Praise: New and Selected Poems (Louisiana State University Press, 1997)
 Carver: A Life in Poems (Front Street, 2001)
 Fortune’s Bones: The Manumission Requiem (Front Street, 2004, notes and annotations by Pamela Espeland)
 The Cachoeira Tales, and Other Poems (Louisiana State University Press, 2005)
 A Wreath for Emmett Till (Houghton Mifflin, 2005, Illustrator Philippe Lardy)
 The Freedom Business: Including A Narrative of the Life and Adventures of Venture, a Native of Africa (Front Street, 2008)
 Sweethearts of Rhythm: The Story Of The Greatest All-Girl Swing Band In The World (Dial Books, 2009, Illustrator Jerry Pinkney)
 Faster Than Light: New and Selected Poems, 1996-2011 (Louisiana State University Press, 2012)
 My Seneca Village (Namelos, 2015)
 The Meeting House (Antrim House, 2016)
 American Ace (Dial Books, 2016)
 How I Discovered Poetry (Speak, 2016)

Chapbooks
 Partial Truth (The Kutenai Press, 1992)
 She-Devil Circus (Aralia Press, 2001)
 Triolets for Triolet (Curbstone Press, 2001)
 The Freedom Business: Connecticut Landscapes Through the Eyes of Venture Smith (Lyme Historical Society, Florence Griswold Museum, 2006, illustrated by American paintings from the Florence Griswold Museum)

Collaborative books
 The Cat Walked Through the Casserole (Carolrhoda Books, 1984, with Pamela Espeland, various illustrators)
 Miss Crandall’s School for Young Ladies and Little Misses of Color (Wordsong, 2007, with Elizabeth Alexander, illustrated by Floyd Cooper)
 Pemba’s Song: A Ghost Story (Scholastic Press, 2008, with Tonya Hegamin)
 Mrs. Nelson's Class (editor, World Enough Writers, 2012)

Translations
 Hundreds of Hens and Other Poems for Children by Halfdan Rasmussen (translated from Danish, Black Willow Press, 1982, with Pamela Espeland, illustrations by D.M. Robinson)
 Hecuba by Euripides, in Euripides I, Penn Greek Drama Series (translated from earlier English translations, University of Pennsylvania Press, 1998)
 The Thirteenth Month by Inge Pedersen (translated from Danish, Oberlin College Press, 2005)
 The Ladder by Halfdan Rasmussen (translated from Danish, Candlewick, 2006, illustrated by Pierre Pratt)
 A Little Bitty Man and Other Poems for the Very Young by Halfdan Rasmussen (translated from Danish with Pamela Espeland, Candlewick, 2011, illustrated by Kevin Hawkes)

Books for young children
 The Cat Walked Through the Casserole (Carolrhoda Books, 1984)
 Beautiful Ballerina (Scholastic Press, 2009, photographs by Susan Kuklin)
 Snook Alone (Candlewick Press, 2010, illustrated by Timothy Basil Ering)
 Ostrich and Lark (Boyds Mills Press, 2012, illustrated by San artists of the Kuru Art Project of Botswana)

In Anthology
 Ghost Fishing: An Eco-Justice Poetry Anthology (University of Georgia Press, 2018)

Honors and awards
Kent fellowship, 1976
National Endowment for the Arts fellowships, 1981, 1990
Connecticut Arts Award, 1990
National Book Award finalist for poetry, 1991
Annisfield-Wolf Award, 1992
Fulbright teaching fellowship, 1995
National Book Award finalist for poetry, 1997
Poets' Prize, 1999, for The Fields of Praise: New and Selected Poems
Contemplative Practices fellowship, American Council of Learned Societies, 2000
named Poet Laureate for the State of Connecticut, Connecticut Commission on the Arts, 2001
J.S. Guggenheim Memorial Foundation fellowship, 2001 for Carver: A Life in Poems
Boston Globe/Horn Book Award, 2001 for Carver: A Life in Poems
National Book Award finalist in young-people's literature category, 2001 for Carver: A Life in Poems
Coretta Scott King Honor Book designation, 2002 for Carver: A Life in Poems
Flora Stieglitz Straus Award for Nonfiction, 2002 for Carver: A Life in Poems
Newbery Honor designation, 2002 for Carver: A Life in Poems
Coretta Scott King Book Award, 2005, for Fortune's Bones: The Manumission Requiem
Two Pushcart prizes 
Michael L. Printz Award honor book designation, 2006 for A Wreath for Emmett Till
Lee Bennett Hopkins Poetry Award honor book designation, 2006 for A Wreath for Emmett Till
Coretta Scott King Honor Award, 2006 for A Wreath for Emmett Till
Lifetime Achievement honor, Connecticut Book Awards, 2006, 
NSK Neustadt Prize for Children’s Literature, 2017.
Ruth Lilly Poetry Prize, 2019. Noted for being "a renowned poet, author, and translator who has worked steadily throughout her career to highlight topics that aren’t often talked about in poetry. Her literary work, spanning more than four decades, examines complex issues around race, feminism, and the ongoing trauma of slavery in American life in narratives poised between song and speech."

References

Further reading

External links
 Official website
 
 Marilyn Nelson Papers - University of Connecticut Archives and Special Collections

1946 births
African-American poets
Living people
National Endowment for the Arts Fellows
Newbery Honor winners
Writers from Cleveland
Poets Laureate of Connecticut
University of California, Davis alumni
University of Connecticut faculty
University of Minnesota alumni
University of Pennsylvania alumni
Poets from Ohio
Writers from Connecticut
20th-century American poets
21st-century American poets
20th-century American women writers
21st-century American women writers
American women poets
20th-century American translators
21st-century American translators
Poets from Connecticut
Formalist poets
American women academics
20th-century African-American women writers
20th-century African-American writers
21st-century African-American women writers
21st-century African-American writers
Fulbright alumni